Geophilus fucorum is a halophilic species of soil centipede in the family Geophilidae found in the French Mediterranean, Corsica, Italy, and Greece. Males of this species have 49 to 53 pairs of legs; females have 51 to 55.

Taxonomy
G. fucorum shares several characteristics with both G. algarum and G. gracilis, which was previously classified as a subspecies of G. fucorum, leading some to believe that the three are a single species consisting of highly individual subspecies. It's differentiated from the two by having 5-7 labral teeth, absence of a clear clypeal area, 12-14 prehensorial teeth, two clustered and one isolated ventral (posterior) pore, and a rudimentary claw of the anal leg.

References 

fucorum
Animals described in 1900
Taxa named by Henry Wilfred Brolemann